Hiawatha is an unincorporated community in Mercer County, West Virginia, United States. Hiawatha had a post office with ZIP code 24729.

The community was named after Hiawatha, an Iroquois chief.

References

Unincorporated communities in Mercer County, West Virginia
Unincorporated communities in West Virginia
Coal towns in West Virginia